Deliathis imperator is a species of beetle in the family Cerambycidae. It was described by James Thomson in 1868. It is known from Mexico.

References

Lamiini
Beetles described in 1868